Edmund Davie Fulton,  (March 10, 1916 – May 22, 2000) was a Canadian Rhodes Scholar, politician and judge. He was born in Kamloops, British Columbia, the son of politician/lawyer Frederick John Fulton and Winnifred M. Davie, daughter of A. E. B. Davie. He was the youngest of 4 children.

Military career
Davie Fulton served in the Second World War with the Canadian Army overseas as Platoon and Company Commander with Seaforth Highlanders of Canada, and as Deputy Assistant Adjutant-General with the 1st Canadian Infantry Division in the Italian and Northwestern Europe campaigns. His brother John "Moose" Fulton distinguished himself in the Royal Canadian Air Force during World War II. He went missing in action in late 1942, and in 1943  Kamloops adopted the Moose Squadron in honour of its commander. In 1944 the Kamloops airport was dedicated as Fulton Field.

Political career
He was brought home from the war by the Conservative Party and won a seat by 100 votes in the House of Commons of Canada in the 1945 general election.

In 1949 he introduced legislation to criminalize the publication, distribution, and sale of crime comics, as the result of a murder by two Yukon teens that was blamed on the influence of the crime comics which the perpetrators had read.

He ran for the leadership of the Progressive Conservative Party of Canada at the 1956 leadership convention, placing third behind John Diefenbaker.

When Diefenbaker led the party to victory in the 1957 election, he appointed Fulton to Cabinet as Minister of Justice. As Minister, Fulton was involved in negotiations to patriate the Canadian Constitution, and developed the "Fulton–Favreau formula". In 1962, he became Minister of Public Works. His cousin, Albert McPhillips, was Parliamentary Secretary to the Minister of Fisheries around this time.

He resigned from Cabinet in 1963, when he decided to leave federal politics and take the leadership of the British Columbia Progressive Conservative Party. His efforts to revive the provincial Tories in BC were a failure, and he returned to the House of Commons in the 1965 election.

Fulton stood as a candidate at the 1967 federal PC leadership convention, and placed third behind Robert Stanfield and Dufferin Roblin.

After losing his seat in the 1968 election, he retired from politics and returned to the law. In 1973, he became a justice on the British Columbia Supreme Court, and served until 1981. From 1986 to 1992, he served as a commissioner on the International Joint Commission.

In 1992, he was made an Officer of the Order of Canada. He died in Vancouver on May 22, 2000.

Archives 
There is a Davie Fulton fonds at Library and Archives Canada.

References

External links
 
Order of Canada Citation

1916 births
2000 deaths
Canadian Army personnel of World War II
Canadian military personnel from British Columbia
British Columbia Conservative Party leaders
Canadian King's Counsel
Judges in British Columbia
Lawyers in British Columbia
Members of the House of Commons of Canada from British Columbia
Members of the King's Privy Council for Canada
Officers of the Order of Canada
People from Kamloops
Progressive Conservative Party of Canada MPs
20th-century Canadian lawyers
Progressive Conservative Party of Canada leadership candidates
Seaforth Highlanders of Canada officers